Robert Zillner (born 4 August 1985) is a German footballer who plays as a left winger who plays for SV Schalding-Heining. He is currently on a free agent.

References

External links

Robert Zillner at Kicker

1985 births
Living people
German footballers
Association football midfielders
Bundesliga players
2. Bundesliga players
3. Liga players
SpVgg Unterhaching players
SpVgg Greuther Fürth players
SV Sandhausen players
SV Schalding-Heining players
SpVgg Unterhaching II players
People from Passau
Sportspeople from Lower Bavaria
Footballers from Bavaria